Patrick Kehoe was an Irish Fianna Fáil politician. A farmer, he was elected to Dáil Éireann as a Fianna Fáil Teachta Dála (TD) for the Wexford constituency at the 1933 general election. He did not contest the 1937 general election. At the 1938 Seanad election, he was elected to Seanad Éireann by the Agricultural Panel. He lost his seat at the 1948 Seanad election.

References

Year of birth missing
Year of death missing
Fianna Fáil TDs
Members of the 8th Dáil
Members of the 2nd Seanad
Members of the 3rd Seanad
Members of the 4th Seanad
Members of the 5th Seanad
Politicians from County Wexford
Irish farmers
Fianna Fáil senators